Alfred Walker (8 September 1827 – 4 September 1870) was an English cricketer.

Walker was born in Southgate, Middlesex and was the second of seven cricket playing brothers – the Walkers of Southgate. He was educated in Stanmore and at Trinity College, Cambridge. He played as a right-handed batsman and an underarm bowler in fourteen first-class matches for Cambridge University (1846–1848) and a Middlesex XI (1851–1859).
He died in Arnos Grove, aged 42.

References

External links 
 Alfred Walker at Cricinfo
 Alfred Walker at Cricket Archive

1827 births
1870 deaths
English cricketers
Alumni of Trinity College, Cambridge
Cambridge University cricketers
Middlesex cricketers
People from Southgate, London
Surrey Club cricketers
Gentlemen of the South cricketers
Gentlemen of England cricketers
Alfred
Cricketers from Greater London